The 1996 2. divisjon, the third highest association football league for men in Norway.

22 games were played in 6 groups, with 3 points given for wins and 1 for draws. Sarpsborg and Runar were promoted to the First Division through playoffs against the other 3 group winners as well as two teams (who both survived) from the First Division. Number eleven and twelve were relegated to the 3. divisjon. The winning teams from each of the 19 groups in the 3. divisjon, plus many number-two teams, were promoted to the 2. divisjon (this was possible because of an enlargement of the 2. divisjon from 6 to 8 groups).

League tables

Group 1

Group 2

Group 3

Group 4

Group 5

Group 6

Promotion playoffs

References

Norwegian Second Division seasons
3
Norway
Norway